Julie Christensen (born January 21, 1956) is an American singer and songwriter. Noted for its versatility, Christensen's music has been praised by critics. As a solo artist, Christensen has released five albums, and in January 2016 released the Franklin, Tennessee-recorded full-length The Cardinal with her Nashville, Tennessee band, Stone Cupid. Christensen had lived in Nashville since 2013, and her band included some of the city's most well-known musicians.

Christensen, a founding member of the Divine Horsemen, has toured extensively with Leonard Cohen.  She has performed with artists including Todd Rundgren, Iggy Pop, Public Image Limited, Van Dyke Parks, John Doe, Exene Cervenka, and k.d. lang.

Early life
Christensen was born in Iowa City and grew up in Newton, Iowa. Her father was a pharmacist and her mother, a nurse, played the organ at local Protestant churches. The oldest of four children, Christensen has three brothers, who were also musicians. Two of her brothers played together in a band, Jonesin', that was inducted into the Iowa Rock and Roll Hall of Fame in 2013.

A lyric soprano, Christensen began singing while she was a child.  She performed at churches, and when she was 11 she appeared on the first of two television talent contests. In high school she learned French, and after she graduated she enrolled at the University of Iowa.  She planned to learn Chinese, and majored in Asian studies.

Career

Early career, the Divine Horsemen
During her first year at the University of Iowa, Christensen joined Longshot, a country-rock band; to tour with them, she dropped out of college. In 1978 she began singing with a show band, and after a year on the road, she moved to Austin, Texas.  In Austin she performed frequently with jazz artists, including bassist and producer Roscoe Beck of the group Passenger, who would later introduce Christensen to Cohen.

In 1981 Christensen moved to Los Angeles. While still performing from time to time with jazz groups, she began to sing with the underground bands of the early Los Angeles punk scene.  In 1982, while sitting in with Top Jimmy & The Rhythm Pigs, she met Chris D., a producer and the founder of the seminal LA band, the Flesh Eaters. Impressed by her voice, he booked her as a backup vocalist for a Top Jimmy session he was producing.   By 1984, Christensen and Chris D. had founded the Divine Horsemen; in 1985 they were married.

The Divine Horsemen's music combined elements of punk, rock, blues roots and country. A reviewer for roots-music magazine No Depression said it "foreshadowed the alt-country genre." With a lineup that included members of X, The Blasters, The Gun Club, as well as Texacala Jones and Kid Congo, the band released their largely acoustic debut album, Time Stands Still, in late 1984. As a reviewer said in 2016, "Right up there with George Jones and Tammy Wynette, with Julie Christensen harmonizing circles around a despondent Chris D. The twin vocals wander, finish one another's sentences, fight, fuck, laugh, cry and then join together in a gorgeously mismatched duo. Christensen's clear Emmylou-cry looms large."

The Divine Horsemen toured frequently and released three studio albums and two EPs between 1984 and 1987. Although they built a substantial following, their success was hampered by alcoholism and addiction within the band.  Christensen struggled with a daily heroin habit, and when she got clean in 1987, she left the band and ended her marriage.

More than three decades after the original Divine Horsemen dissolved, the band reformed. A new album called "Hot Rise of an Ice Cream Phoenix" was released in 2021.

Leonard Cohen
Three months after she left the Divine Horsemen, she was approached by Roscoe Beck about working as a backup vocalist on an upcoming Leonard Cohen tour. Christensen excelled during her audition with Cohen's band—with her mother on piano, she had sung Leonard Cohen songs since she was a child.  Next, she met with Cohen.  He pointed out over lunch that the tour would be grueling, and Christensen responded with stories regarding the years she'd spent on tour with the Divine Horsemen, playing at venues such as CBGB and the Cathay de Grande. Cohen was reportedly charmed. She and Perla Batalla began a 7-month tour as back-up singers for Cohen in March 1988, and continued to tour with him off and on for the next six years.

In 2003, Came So Far for Beauty: An Evening of Leonard Cohen Songs was commissioned by the Celebrate Brooklyn Performing Arts Festival with support from the Canadian Consulate General New York. Christensen took part in several performances of Came So Far for Beauty, which were curated and produced by Hal Wilner. In addition to singing with Lou Reed, Nick Cave, Antony, and Anna McGarrigle, she sang "A Singer Must Die" and dueted with Batalla on "Anthem".

The documentary film Leonard Cohen: I'm Your Man was based on the 2005 Sydney performance of Came So Far for Beauty. Christensen was featured both in the film and on the accompanying soundtrack, released by Verve Forecast in 2006.

Solo career and Stone Cupid

In 1989 Christensen signed with Polygram Records. Todd Rundgren produced the album, which was slated to be her solo debut. "She was unlike a lot of female singers, who may be creative in their songwriting and write suitably for their own delivery, but don't really try a broad range of styles," Rundgren said.  "It was her ability to sing with conviction in a variety of approaches that made her extraordinary to me." In 1990 Polygram was restructured, and the record was shelved and Christensen dropped from the label.

In 1991 Christensen featured in the Barry Levinson-directed film Bugsy, credited as ‘Ciros singer’.

In 1994 Christensen (who had remarried and become a mother) moved from Los Angeles to Ojai, California, where she focused on songwriting and recording as a solo artist. Unable to retrieve the master recordings from the Polygram sessions, she re-recorded some of its material and released it along with several new songs on her solo debut, 1996's Love is Driving.   Her second solo album, Soul Driver came out in 2000, and in 2006 and 2007 she released Something Familiar and Where the Fireworks Are, two stylistically distinct records that she wrote and recorded simultaneously. Rather than using her own name, she often performed and recorded using the name Stone Cupid.

With 2012's Weeds Like Us, Christensen returned to her folk-rock roots. The album had taken shape several years earlier as an acoustic project which would be produced by Christensen's long time friend and mentor, Kenny Edwards.  Edwards died in 2010, succumbing to a blood clot that resulted from the chemotherapy treatment he was undergoing for cancer.  Devastated by his loss, Christensen put the album on hold until 2012.  Re-envisioned, it was produced by Jeff Turmes, best known for his work with Mavis Staples.

Christensen and her family relocated to Nashville in 2013. In addition to performing as a solo artist, she played regularly with a band composed of guitarists Chris Tench and Sergio Webb, bassist Bones Hillman and drummer Steve Latanation. They used the name Stone Cupid, and in January 2016 they released The Cardinal, co-produced by Christensen and Turmes.

Personal life
Christensen is married to actor John Diehl.  Their son, Magnus Jackson Diehl, is an actor.

Discography

with Stone Cupid
 The Cardinal (2016)

as Julie Christensen 
 Love Is Driving (1996)
 Soul Driver (2000)
 Something Familiar (2006)
 Where the Fireworks Are (2007)
 Weeds Like Us (2012)

with the Divine Horsemen
Time Stands Still (Enigma) 1984
Devil's River (SST) 1986Middle of the Night(SST) 1986Snake Handler'' (SST) 1987

References

External links
 Stone Cupid official site
 The Leonard Cohen Files

1956 births
20th-century American women singers
American women pop singers
Leonard Cohen
Living people
People from Greater Los Angeles
University of Iowa alumni
20th-century American singers